Bhaaryaavijayam is a 1977 Indian Malayalam film, directed by A. B. Raj and produced by Sadanandan. The film stars Jayabharathi and Vincent in the lead roles. The film has musical score by M. K. Arjunan.

Cast
Jayabharathi
Vincent

Soundtrack
The music was composed by M. K. Arjunan and the lyrics were written by Sreekumaran Thampi.

References

External links
 

1977 films
1970s Malayalam-language films